William Hansel Hurst (born April 28, 1970) is a former Major League Baseball player.

Hurst played for Palmetto High School in Miami, and then for Central Florida Community College.

Drafted by the St. Louis Cardinals in the 20th round of the 1989 amateur entry draft, on December 10, 1992, he was released by the Cardinals.  On March 12, 1995, he signed as a free agent with the Florida Marlins.

He started 1996 by saving 30 games with a 2.20 ERA for the Portland Sea Dogs of the Eastern League.  He debuted in the majors on September 18, 1996.  Hurst pitched in two games for the Florida Marlins in the 1996 season. He pitched two innings and had one strike out, with a walk, and not allowing a run to score.

Hurst is Jewish, and appears in the fifth edition of Jewish Major Leaguers baseball cards.

References

External links

1970 births
Living people
Baseball players from Florida
Brevard County Manatees players
College of Central Florida Patriots baseball players
Charlotte Knights players
Florida Marlins players
Gulf Coast Tigers players
Hamilton Redbirds players
Jacksonville Suns players
Jewish American baseball players
Jewish Major League Baseball players
Johnson City Cardinals players
Lakeland Tigers players
Major League Baseball pitchers
Portland Sea Dogs players
Sportspeople from Miami Beach, Florida
Toledo Mud Hens players
21st-century American Jews